James Brown House may refer to:

in the United States (by state)
James Brown House (Riverdale, Iowa), in Scott County, listed on the National Register of Historic Places (NRHP)
James Brown House (St. Matthews, Kentucky), listed on the National Register of Historic Places in Jefferson County, Kentucky
 James B. Brown House, Hannibal, Ralls County, Missouri, NRHP-listed
 James Brown House (Manhattan), New York City, NRHP-listed
 Jim Brown House, Peninsula, Summit County, Ohio, NRHP-listed

See also
Brown House (disambiguation)